Igor Petrovich Petrenko (born August 23, 1977) is a Russian actor of cinema and theater. In 2002 President of Russia, Vladimir Putin gave him The State prize of Russia.

Biography
Igor Petrenko was born on August 23, 1977, in Potsdam (GDR) in the family of the Soviet soldiers. His father Pyotr Vladimirovich Petrenko was a lieutenant colonel, and in addition to military service, he was a candidate of chemical sciences. Igor's mother, Tatyana Anatolievna Petrenko, was a professional translator from English. When Igor was three years old, the family moved to Moscow.

As a child, the main hobbies were gymnastics, judo and sambo, when among the favorite school subjects was English language.

In 2000 he was graduated from The Shchepkin Higher Theatre School in Moscow. Igor become famous actor after he was appearing in the "Zvezda" TV Series. Thanks to his role in the Series he won the "Nika" award in the nomination as the "Discovery of the year" in 2003.

For his acting skills, the actor was awarded the Presidential Award (Officially, the State Prize of the Russian Federation), and in 2004 he was awarded the "Triumph" Award as the best young actor.

In 2012, he performed the role of Sherlock Holmes in new series based on the works of Arthur Conan Doyle.

Personal life
Petrenko married his classmate, actress Irina Leonova, immediately after both graduated in 2000. The marriage ended four years later.

In 2004 he divorced Leonova to marry actress Ekaterina Klimova, with whom he struck up a romance on the set of Moscow Windows.  In addition to Klimova's daughter from a previous marriage, Liza Khoroshilova, Petrenko and Klimova had two boys together, Matvey and Korney. They divorced on 10 July 2014.

Petrenko has a daughter named Sophia-Karolina (b. 24 December 2014) with St. Petersburg actress Kristina Brodskaya.

Selected filmography

Film

Television

References

External links

1977 births
Living people
People from Potsdam
Russian male film actors
Russian male television actors
Russian male stage actors
21st-century Russian male actors
State Prize of the Russian Federation laureates
Recipients of the Nika Award